Haeju Stadium is a multi-use stadium in Haeju, North Korea.  It is currently used mostly for football matches. The stadium holds 25,000 people.

See also 

 List of football stadiums in North Korea

References 

Sports venues in North Korea
Football venues in North Korea
Buildings and structures in South Hwanghae Province